The Narciso Ramos Bridge, formerly known as the Asingan–Sta. Maria Bridge, is a highway bridge which connects the municipalities of Asingan and Santa Maria in Pangasinan, Philippines. Crossing the Agno River, it is part of the Asingan–Sta Maria Road It is the longest bridge in Pangasinan and the entire Ilocos Region.

The bridge is named after Filipino legislator and Asingan native Narciso Ramos through Republic Act No. 9030 which became law in 2001.

References

Buildings and structures in Pangasinan
Bridges in the Philippines